In the 2004 season of the Esiliiga, the second-tier league of the Estonian football league system, the Tammeka team finished in top position. Tammeka, Tervis and Dünamo won promotion to the Meistriliiga and no team was relegated to the II Liiga.

Final table of Esiliiga season 2004

Promotion playoff

JK Dünamo Tallinn beat FC Lootus Alutaguse 5–2 on aggregate. Dünamo promoted to Meistriliiga, Lootus relegated to Esiliiga.

Relegation play-off

Tallinna Jalgpalliklubi beat FC Puuma Tallinn 4–1 on aggregate. TJK stayed in Esiliiga, Puuma in Second Division.

Topscorers

See also
 2004 Meistriliiga

Esiliiga seasons
2
Estonia
Estonia